Ushongo is a Local Government Area of Benue State, Nigeria. Its headquarters is Lessel town, Ushongo Local government Area of Benue State.

Ushongo Local Government  postal code is 982.

References

Local Government Areas in Benue State